Cottonbelly may refer to:
 Jervis Cottonbelly, professional wrestling gimmick that made its debut in 2005
 Stuart Matthewman (born 1960), English musician also known as Cottonbelly